Daniel Theis (born April 4, 1992) is a German professional basketball player for the Indiana Pacers of the National Basketball Association (NBA). After seven seasons in the Basketball Bundesliga where he was a four-time All Star and three-time champion, Theis signed with the Boston Celtics of the NBA where he played for four seasons before a trade brought him to the Chicago Bulls in March 2021. The Bulls traded Theis to the Houston Rockets in August 2021, who in turn traded Theis back to the Celtics in February 2022, before being traded to the Indiana Pacers in July 2022. With the Celtics, he reached the NBA Finals during his second stint with the team.

Early life 
Born in Salzgitter, Theis went through the Braunschweig youth system.

Professional career

Phantoms Braunschweig (2010–2012) 
Theis made his debut in the German top-tier level league, the Basketball Bundesliga, during the 2010–11 season. Theis primarily gained playing time with Braunschweig's development squad, where he played alongside his older brother, Frank, from 2010 to 2012. He earned the Eurobasket.com website's All-2.Pro B Most Improved Player of the Year honors in 2011. In Braunschweig, Theis was also a teammate of fellow future NBA player Dennis Schröder.

ratiopharm Ulm (2012–2014) 
In the 2013–14 season, while with ratiopharm Ulm, Theis won the BBL Best Young Player award.

Brose Bamberg (2014–2017) 
Following his breakout season with Ulm, Theis signed with fellow German Bundesliga club Brose Bamberg. In the 2014 off-season, he played in the 2014 NBA Summer League for the Washington Wizards' summer league team.

In the 2014–15 season, Theis won his first German League championship with Brose Baskets. Brose beat FC Bayern Munich 3–2 in the German League Finals. In April 2015, he signed a fresh two-year deal with the Bamberg team, and he won two more German championships with Bamberg, in 2016 and 2017.

Boston Celtics (2017–2021)
On July 20, 2017, Theis signed with the Boston Celtics. He made his NBA debut on October 18 against the Milwaukee Bucks. On March 12, 2018, Theis suffered a torn meniscus in his left knee, and missed the remainder of the 2017–18 season after Theis repaired his left knee lateral meniscus in a surgery.

On October 29, 2018, Theis was found to have a slight tear of the plantar fascia in his right foot and was scheduled to be out indefinitely, but he returned shortly after the injury on November 11 vs. the Portland Trail Blazers.

On July 17, 2019, the Boston Celtics announced that they had re-signed Theis, along with former Brose Bamberg teammate Brad Wanamaker. The contract was reported to be worth $10 million in total for the 2019–20 and 2020–21 seasons.

Two thirds through the season, on February 21, 2020, Theis had a career-high 25 points and 16 rebounds in a win against the Minnesota Timberwolves. Celtics coach Brad Stevens said that Theis complemented the rest of the starters, playing in a way that "fits the other guys perfect."

Chicago Bulls (2021)
On March 25, 2021, Theis was traded to the Chicago Bulls in a three-team trade involving the Washington Wizards. By April 12, he had worked his way into the starting lineup against the Memphis Grizzlies. On April 26, Theis scored 23 points and had 12 rebounds and 5 assists in a 110–102 victory against the Miami Heat.

Houston Rockets (2021–2022)
On August 7, 2021, Theis was traded to the Houston Rockets via a sign-and-trade deal.

Return to the Celtics (2022)
On February 10, 2022, the Boston Celtics re-acquired Theis from the Rockets in exchange for Bruno Fernando, Enes Freedom, and Dennis Schröder. Theis and the Celtics reached the NBA Finals, but lost to the Golden State Warriors in 6 games.

Indiana Pacers (2022–present)
On July 9, 2022, Theis was traded, alongside Nik Stauskas, Aaron Nesmith, Malik Fitts, Juwan Morgan and a 2023 first-round pick, to the Indiana Pacers in exchange for Malcolm Brogdon. Theis made his Pacers debut on February 2, 2023, after missing over 3 months with a knee injury.

National team career
Theis was a member of the junior national teams of Germany. With Germany's junior national teams, he played at the 2011 FIBA Europe Under-20 Championship, and the 2012 FIBA Europe Under-20 Championship.

On July 27, 2014, Theis made his first appearance with the senior German national basketball team in a game against Finland. With Germany's senior team, he played at the EuroBasket 2015 qualification tournament.

Career statistics

NBA

Regular season

|-
| style="text-align:left;"| 
| style="text-align:left;"| Boston
| 63 || 3 || 14.9 || .541 || .310 || .753 || 4.3 || .9 || .5 || .8 || 5.3
|-
| style="text-align:left;"| 
| style="text-align:left;"| Boston
| 66 || 2 || 13.8 || .549 || .388 || .737 || 3.4 || 1.0 || .3 || .6 || 5.7
|-
| style="text-align:left;"| 
| style="text-align:left;"| Boston
| 65 || 64 || 24.1 || .566 || .333 || .763 || 6.6 || 1.7 || .6 || 1.3 || 9.2
|-
| style="text-align:left;"| 
| style="text-align:left;"| Boston
| 42 || 37 || 24.5 || .552 || .347 || .687 || 5.2 || 1.6 || .6 || 1.0 || 9.5
|-
| style="text-align:left;"| 
| style="text-align:left;"| Chicago
| 23 || 14 || 25.0 || .522 || .281 || .651 || 5.9 || 1.8 || .7 || .6 || 10.0
|-
| style="text-align:left;"| 
| style="text-align:left;"| Houston
| 26 || 21 || 22.5 || .469 || .291 || .675 || 5.0 || .8 || .4 || .7 || 8.4
|-
| style="text-align:left;"| 
| style="text-align:left;"| Boston
| 21 || 6 || 18.7 || .598 || .357 || .688 || 4.7 || 1.0 || .4 || .7 || 7.9
|- class="sortbottom"
| style="text-align:center;" colspan="2"| Career
| 306 || 147 || 19.6 || .545 || .329 || .722 || 4.9 || 1.3 || .5 || .9 || 7.6

Playoffs

|-
| style="text-align:left;"| 2019
| style="text-align:left;"| Boston
| 7 || 0 || 6.0 || .357|| .000 || 1.000 || 1.4 || .0|| .1 || .1 || 1.7
|-
| style="text-align:left;"| 2020
| style="text-align:left;"| Boston
| 17 || 17 || 28.4 || .521 || .154 || .788 || 7.1 || 1.5 || .4 || 1.2 || 8.9
|-
| style="text-align:left;"| 2022
| style="text-align:left;"| Boston
| 16 || 5 || 12.5 || .588 || .214 || .750 || 3.3 || .7 || .3 || .5 || 4.3
|- class="sortbottom"
| style="text-align:center;" colspan="2"| Career
| 40 || 22 || 18.1 || .527 || .167 || .791 || 4.6 || .9 || .3 || .8 || 5.8

EuroLeague

|-
| style="text-align:left;"| 2015–16
| style="text-align:left;"| Brose Bamberg
| 24 || 1 || 19.6 || .536 || .389 || .764 || 4.4 || .5 || .5 || .6 || 9.2 || 9.4
|-
| style="text-align:left;"| 2016–17
| style="text-align:left;"| Brose Bamberg
| 30 || 1 || 19.7 || .598 || .410 || .709 || 4.6 || .7 || .7 || .9 || 9.6 || 10.7
|- class="sortbottom"
| style="text-align:center;" colspan="2"| Career
| 54 || 2 || 19.7 || .571 || .400 || .736 || 4.5 || .6 || .6 || .8 || 9.4 || 10.1

References

External links
Euroleague.net profile

Eurobasket.com profile

1992 births
Living people
2019 FIBA Basketball World Cup players
Basketball Löwen Braunschweig players
Boston Celtics players
Brose Bamberg players
Centers (basketball)
Chicago Bulls players
German men's basketball players
Houston Rockets players
Indiana Pacers players
National Basketball Association players from Germany
People from Salzgitter
Power forwards (basketball)
Ratiopharm Ulm players
Sportspeople from Lower Saxony
Undrafted National Basketball Association players